Seductive Reasoning is the debut album by the sibling folk duo Maggie and Terre Roche, released in 1975 on Columbia Records.  It precedes their 1979 debut album as a trio, The Roches.

Track listing
All tracks composed by Margaret Roche, except where indicated.

 "Underneath the Moon" 
 "Down the Dream" 
 "Wigglin' Man" (Margaret Roche, Terre Roche)
 "West Virginia"
 "If You Emptied Out All Of Your Pockets You Could Not Make The Change"
 "Telephone Bill"
 "Malachy's"
 "Burden of Proof"
 "The Mountain People"
 "Jill of All Trades"

Personnel
Musicians:
Maggie Roche – piano and guitar
Terre Roche – guitar
The Muscle Shoals Rhythm Section:
Roger Hawkins – drums
David Hood – bass
Barry Beckett–  keyboards
Pete Carr – guitar
Jimmy Johnson – guitar

Additional musicians:
Johnny Gimble – fiddle
George Marge – electric clarinet
Ann Odell – strings
John Hall – electric guitar
Paul Simon – guitar
Jerry Masters – bass

Production:
 1, 2, 3, 6, 8, 9: produced by David Hood and Jimmy Johnson; engineers – Greg Hamm, Steve Melton, Jerry Masters
 4, 7, 10: produced by Paul Samwell Smith; engineer – Martin Levan
 5: produced by Paul Simon; engineers –  Steve Melton, Phil Ramone

Cover photo by Chip Berlet.

References 

All information from the original album cover has been verified by a Wikipedian https://en.wikipedia.org/wiki/Chip_Berlet

1975 debut albums
The Roches albums
Albums produced by Paul Samwell-Smith
Albums produced by Paul Simon